The Englishman of the Bones (Spanish:El inglés de los güesos) is a 1940 Argentine drama film based on a novel of the same name.

Production

The 79-minute black and white drama was directed for Lumiton by Carlos Hugo Christensen.
Christiansen (1914–1999) was a poet, short story writer, journalist and playwright who became an assistant film director in 1939. 
This was one of the first films where he was credited as director.
The script was written by Christensen based on the novel of the same name written by Benito Lynch.
Music was by George Andreani and cinematography by José María Beltrán.
It was released in Argentina on 4 September 1940.
The film El inglés de los güesos starred Arturo García Buhr, Anita Jordán and Pedro Maratea.

Synopsis

El inglés de los güesos tells of a hopeless love between an English anthropologist and a gaucho girl.
The Englishman, who has come to study fossils, must return to his homeland.
The film treats the novel with respect, and provides a true interpretation.

Reception

La Nación said of the film that the simple plot had been well handled. The adaptation retained the extraordinary sense of scenery and drama.
Manrupe and Portela said that despite the very slow action and the poor book, the film maintains interest because of good performances.
Some elements of the framing and montage foreshadow the director's later style.

Cast
The cast includes:

 Arturo García Buhr
 Anita Jordán
 Pedro Maratea
 Elisardo Santalla
 Raimundo Pastore
 Tito Alonso
 Aurelia Ferrer
 Herminia Mancini
 Alfredo Jordan

References

Citations

Sources

1940 films
1940s Spanish-language films
Argentine black-and-white films
Argentine drama films
1940 drama films